Guitar Ray & The Gamblers are an Italian blues band founded in 2002. Since 2006, the band members have consisted of Ray Scona on vocals and guitar, Gab D on bass guitar, Henry Carpaneto on piano and Marco Fuliano on the drums. The core of the band is Ray Scona, guitarist and singer, born in 1963 in Chiavari (Genova). Scona began playing at the age of thirteen, and—30 years later—still carries his first Fender Stratocaster on tour.

History 
The band members began collaborating with other blues performers in 2002, when they toured with Sonny Rhodes, Keith Dunn, Bill Thomas, Paul Orta and Johnny Sansone until 2004. The year the tour ended, Otis Grand produced The Gamblers' first two albums: New Sensation and Poorman Blues. In 2005 the band met Jerry Portnoy and began a collaboration that lasted for another two tours. In 2007 they contributed to the album “Hipster Blues” by Otis Grand and took part in his tour through Norway and Poland. In December 2009 the band began its first European tour as "Guitar Ray & The Gamblers," traveling through Germany, Belgium, France and Denmark.

In 2010, the band toured with Paul Reddick and Canadian singer-songwriter Roxanne Potvin through France, Belgium, Denmark, Germany, Austria and Italy. In June of that year, at a festival in France, the group met Lea Gilmore, who invited the Gamblers to tour Europe with her.
  
That same year the band met bluesman Big Pete Pearson and began an intense collaboration. The band took part in three European tours with Pearson; two in 2011 and one in 2012. The Gamblers also played on Choose, a traditional blues album Pearson released in 2012.

In summer 2012 the band performed in Fabio Treves’ summer tour, and has since been collaborating with musicians including Jerry Portnoy, Big Pete Pearson, Keith Dunn, Otis Grand, Paul Reddick, and Lea Gilmore. They have played many blues festivals.

In 2013 Guitar Ray & The Gamblers returned to the studio to record a new album, with Reddick as artistic producer. The band plans to tour with Pearson in the spring.

Discography
2012 – Choose with Big Pete Pearson
2009 – As the Years Go Passing By, DVD
2007 – Poorman Blues
2005 – New Sensation

References

External links

Italian musical groups